Park End may be one of several places in the United Kingdom:
Park End, Bedfordshire, England
Park End, Cambridgeshire, England
Park End, Middlesbrough, England
Park End, Northumberland, England
Park End, Somerset, England
Park End, South Ayrshire, Scotland
Park End, Staffordshire, England
Park End, Worcestershire, England

See also
Parkend, Gloucestershire, England
Parkend railway station
Parkend, Lewis, Scotland